Pultenaea linophylla, commonly known as halo bush-pea, is a species of flowering plant in the family Fabaceae and is endemic to south-eastern continental Australia. It is an erect or prostrate shrub with spreading branches, linear to elliptic or wedge-shaped leaves, and yellow to orange and red to purple flowers.

Description
The upper surface of the leaves is darker than the lower.

Taxonomy and naming
Pultenaea linophylla was first formally described in 1797 by Heinrich Schrader and Johann Christoph Wendland in Sertum Hannoveranum from specimens collected near Botany Bay. The specific epithet (linophylla) means "thread-leaved".

Distribution and habitat
Halo push-pea grows in forest and heath from south-eastern Queensland, the coast and tablelands of New South Wales to eastern Victoria.

References

linophylla
Flora of Queensland
Flora of New South Wales
Flora of Victoria (Australia)
Plants described in 1797
Taxa named by Johann Christoph Wendland